Takate is a small town and rural commune in Agadir province of the Sous Massa Daraa region of Morocco. At the time of the 2004 census, the commune had a total population of 11479 people living in 2202 households.

References

Populated places in Essaouira Province
Rural communes of Marrakesh-Safi